John Edward Jones III (born June 13, 1955) is the 30th President at Dickinson College and a former United States district judge of the United States District Court for the Middle District of Pennsylvania.

Early life and education
Jones was born in 1955 in Pottsville, Pennsylvania and raised in Orwigsburg, Pennsylvania. He attended Blue Mountain High School in Schuylkill Haven, Pennsylvania. He graduated from Mercersburg Academy and then earned his Bachelor of Arts degree from Dickinson College in 1977 and Juris Doctor from Penn State Dickinson Law in 1980.

Career

Attorney
After clerking for Guy A. Bowe, the president-county judge for Schuylkill County from 1980 to 1983, Jones joined the Dolbin & Cori, a law firm. When he was made partner, the name of the firm was changed to Dolbin, Cori & Jones.

In 1986, Jones began his own private practice, John Jones & Associates. He spent the next years as a trial lawyer. He also served as solicitor for several municipalities, including his hometown of Pottsville, and was a part-time assistant Schuylkill County public defender until 1995. From around 1992 until his appointment to the federal bench, Jones served as counsel to the Reading firm of Roland & Schlegel.

Political career
In 1992, Jones unsuccessfully ran as a Republican for the U.S. House of Representatives for the Sixth Congressional District seat and then was co-chair of the transition team for Governor-elect Tom Ridge.

Jones was the chairman of the Pennsylvania Liquor Control Board from 1995 to 2002, a period marked by some controversy. He was part of a failed attempt to privatize state stores, and he banned Bad Frog Beer after determining that its label (a frog giving the finger) was in bad taste. He briefly considered running for governor in 2001.

Federal judge
Jones was appointed to fill a vacancy on the United States District Court for the Middle District of Pennsylvania by President George W. Bush in February 2002. He was unanimously confirmed by the U.S. Senate on July 30 and was commissioned on August 2. He became Chief Judge on June 1, 2020. Before the Kitzmiller decision, he was rumored to be among the top choices for nomination to the US Supreme Court.

Bair v. Shippensburg (2003)
In 2003, Jones heard the case of Shippensburg University students Walt Bair and Ellen Wray, who sued the school in an effort to stop enforcing a speech code. The speech code banned all "acts of intolerance" including racist, sexist and homophobic speech. Jones ruled against the university, explaining that while the code was well intentioned, it went too far in regulating speech. Jones issued an order that prohibited Shippensburg from enforcing four provisions of the Student Code of Conduct. Jones found that the government may not prohibit speech based solely on the impact it will have on the listener.

Kitzmiller v. Dover (2005)
Jones was assigned to the Kitzmiller v. Dover Area School District bench trial, the first direct challenge brought in the federal courts against a school district that mandated the teaching of intelligent design. He was praised by Tom Ridge, former Pennsylvania Governor and former head of the Department of Homeland Security, who said that "I can't imagine a better judge presiding over such an emotionally charged issue ... he has an inquisitive mind, a penetrating intellect and an incredible sense of humor."

On December 20, 2005, Jones ruled that the mandate was unconstitutional in a 139-page decision.

After the ruling was handed down, some pundits immediately attacked it, notably Bill O'Reilly on Fox News accusing Jones of being a fascist and an activist judge. Casey Luskin and Jonathan Witt of the Discovery Institute, and activist Phyllis Schlafly, have leveled similar charges. Jones also received death threats as a result of which he and his family were given around-the-clock federal protection.

In a speech to the Anti-Defamation League on February 10, 2006, he responded to critics who claimed that he had "stabbed the evangelicals who got him onto the federal bench right in the back" by noting that his duty was to the Constitution and not to special interest groups.

In a November 2006 talk given at Bennington College, Jones again rejected the "activist judge" criticisms and explained the judiciary role and how judges decide cases:

In 2008, Jones was awarded the American Humanist Association's Humanist Religious Liberty Award at the World Humanist Congress in Washington, D.C. In his acceptance speech, Jones explained how he was blasted by Bill O'Reilly, Phyllis Schlafly, and Ann Coulter for the decision in Kitzmiller v. Dover Area School District. Jones also remarked on the shortcomings of civics education and how the American public tends to have a limited understanding of the Constitution and the importance of the Establishment Clause of the First Amendment and separation of church and state established by the Founding Fathers of the United States. Jones gave his perspective on the separation of powers under the U.S. Constitution: "Articles 1 and 2 designate the legislative branch and the executive branch, respectively, as majoritarian—they are subject to the will of the people; they stand in popular elections. But article 3 is counter-majoritarian. The judicial branch protects against the tyranny of the majority. We are a bulwark against public opinion. And that was very much done with a purpose, and I think that it really has withstood the test of time. The judiciary is a check against the unconstitutional abuse and extension of power by the other branches of government." Jones added that Alexander Hamilton himself remarked: "Enthusiasm is certainly a very good thing but religious enthusiasm is, at least, a dangerous instrument."

Whitewood v. Wolf (2014)

In 2014, Jones presided over Deb Whitewood et al. v. Michael Wolf, a case in which the plaintiffs sought relief from Pennsylvania's Marriage Laws (23 Pa. C.S. § 1102). He delivered an opinion striking down the Pennsylvania statute barring same-sex marriage on May 20, 2014, on grounds that it unconstitutionally infringed the plaintiffs rights of due process and equal protection guaranteed by the Fourteenth Amendment to the U.S. Constitution. He did not attach a stay to his order, so the decision would be immediately effective.

In 2014, Jones appeared on CNN to discuss same-sex marriage and the law he anticipated would be applied by the U.S. Supreme Court.

Personal life
Jones is a Lutheran of Welsh descent. He married his wife, Beth Ann, in 1982. They have two children, and three grandchildren. He has a share in a business operated by others in his family, Distinct Golf, which runs five golf courses in New Jersey and Pennsylvania.

Jones is a member of the board of regents of Mercersburg Academy and the 30th president of Dickinson College, a private, residential liberal arts college in Carlisle, Pennsylvania. Jones also serves as co-chair of the Pennsylvania Commission on Judicial Independence. He was appointed by Chief Justice Roberts to the Judicial Security Committee of the Judicial Conference of the United States.

Awards, positions, and honors
Member of the Raven's Claw Honorary Society at Dickinson College
Former board member and president-elect of the National Alcohol Beverage Control Association (resigned when appointed to federal bench).
Distinguished Alumnus Award, Dickinson School of Law
Welsh Citizen of the Year Award, St. David's Society of Schuylkill and Carbon Counties.
Former assistant Scoutmaster and other positions in the Boy Scouts of America
2006, included in Time magazine's 100 Most Influential People of the Year.
2007, honorary doctorate, Muhlenberg College.
Board of trustees, Dickinson College
Board of directors, Federal Judges Association
Board of directors, Justice at Stake
2008, American Humanist Association Humanist Religious Liberty Award.
2009, President's Medal, Geological Society of America.

References

External links

John E. Jones III biography via United States District Court for the Middle District of Pennsylvania

Judge Jones' commencement address at Dickinson College, May 21, 2006
Honorary degree citation for Judge Jones by Dickinson College, May 21, 2006
Judge Jones on Judicial Independence From a speech given by Jones to the Anti-Defamation League's National Executive Committee Meeting, February 10, 2006
Judge John E. Jones at Procapitalism U.S.A.
Written opinion of the United States District Court of the Middle District of Pennsylvania in the case of Kitzmiller v. Dover Area School  (PDF format from Findlaw)
Written opinion of the United States District Court of the Middle District of Pennsylvania in the case of Kitzmiller v. Dover Area School  (HTML format from TalkOrigins)
Radio interview of Judge Jones
John Jones: The Judge Who Ruled for Darwin Time magazine's "TIME 100: The People Who Shape Our World"
Video of Judge Jones on Judicial Independence - Difficult Dialogues series September 26, 2006.
 September 25, 2008.
Decision in Whitewood v. Wolf

1955 births
Living people
American Lutherans
American people of Welsh descent
Candidates in the 1992 United States elections
20th-century American politicians
Dickinson College alumni
Dickinson School of Law alumni
Judges of the United States District Court for the Middle District of Pennsylvania
Pennsylvania lawyers
Pennsylvania Republicans
People from Pottsville, Pennsylvania
Public defenders
United States district court judges appointed by George W. Bush
21st-century American judges
Critics of creationism